Scrimshaw is scrollwork, engravings, and carvings done in bone or ivory. Typically it refers to the artwork created by whalers, engraved on the byproducts of whales, such as bones or cartilage. It is most commonly made out of the bones and teeth of sperm whales, the baleen of other whales, and the tusks of walruses. 

It takes the form of elaborate engravings in the form of pictures and lettering on the surface of the bone or tooth, with the engraving highlighted using a pigment, or, less often, small sculptures made from the same material. However, the latter really fall into the categories of ivory carving, for all carved teeth and tusks, or bone carving. The making of scrimshaw probably began on whaling ships in the late 18th century and survived until the ban on commercial whaling. The practice survives as a hobby and as a trade for commercial artisans. A maker of scrimshaw is known as a scrimshander. The word first appeared in the logbook of the brig By Chance in 1826, but the etymology is uncertain.

History and materials

Scrimshaw developed from the practice of sailors on whaling ships creating common tools, where the byproducts of whales were readily available. The term originally referred to the making of these tools, only later referring to works of art created by whalers in their spare time. Whale bone was ideally suited for the task, as it is easy to work and was plentiful.

The widespread carving of scrimshaw was enabled when the 1815 publication of the journal of U.S. Navy Captain David Porter disclosed both the market and the source of the whale teeth, causing a surplus of whale teeth that greatly diminished their value and made them available as a material for ordinary seamen. Around this time is the earliest authenticated pictorial piece of sperm whale scrimshaw (1817). The tooth was inscribed: "This is the tooth of a sperm whale that was caught near the Galápagos Islands by the crew of the ship Adam [of London], and made 100 barrels of oil in the year 1817."

Other sea animal ivories were used as alternatives to the rarer whale teeth. Walrus tusks, for example, may have been acquired in trade from indigenous walrus hunters.

Scrimshaw was a leisure activity for creative whalers. Because the work of whaling was very dangerous at the best of times, whalers were unable to work at night. This gave them a great deal more free time than other sailors. A lot of scrimshaw was unsigned, and a great many of the pieces are anonymous. Early scrimshaw was done with crude sailing needles, and the movement of the ship, as well as the skill of the artist, produced drawings of varying levels of detail and artistry. Originally, candle black, soot or tobacco juice would have been used to bring the etched design into view. Also, ink was used that the sailors would bring on before the voyage. Today's artists use finer tools in various sizes, mostly borrowed from the dental industry. Some scrimshanders ink their work with more than one color, and restrained polychromed examples of this art are now popular.

Originating in an era when sperm whales were plentiful, only to be hunted to near collapse, scrimshaw is no longer an artform utilizing an easily renewable animal resource, but one that is susceptible to contraband. The Endangered Species Act and international conventions restricted the harvest and sale of ivory in an effort to bolster populations of ivory-bearing animals.
 Though there are sources of ivory that are sanctioned and legal, poachers in Africa and other continents where elephants are an endangered species still kill for their ivory. Elephant ivory has been regulated since 1976 by the Convention on International Trade in Endangered Species and selling African ivory has been prohibited since 1989.
 19th and 20th century scrimshaw crafted before 1989 (elephant) or before 1973 (sperm whale ivory, walrus ivory etc.) is legal. It is prohibited after those years for commercial import in the U.S. under the Marine Mammal Protection Act.
 Walrus tusks bearing the Alaska State walrus ivory registration tag, and post-law walrus ivory that has been carved or scrimshawed by an indigenous Alaskan, is legal.
 Ancient ivory, such as 10,000- to 40,000-year-old mammoth or fossilized walrus ivory, is unrestricted in its sale or possession under federal law. 

Scrimshanders and collectors acquire legal whale teeth and marine tusks through estate sales, auctions and antique dealers. To avoid illegal ivory, collectors and artists check provenance and deal only with established and reputable dealers. Scrimshaw that is found to have been illegally sourced may be seized by customs officials worldwide, dramatically loses value and is very hard to re-sell, as the limited channels through which collectible scrimshaw passes serves as a check on unscrupulous persons. As with any other fine art form, it is possible for experienced museums, auction houses or other experts to detect a fake.

Scrimshaw can also be practical tools that are hand carved by the scrimshander. They carved useful tools such as the jagging wheel. which is a multi-purpose tool used to pierce and trim a pie crust. Corset busks were carved from bone or ivory.

Care and preservation
Ivory is a fragile medium; many 19th-century pieces were preserved because they were kept in a barrel of oil on board ship. Gary Kiracofe, a scrimshander in Nantucket, Massachusetts, advises collectors that if a piece looks dry, one should fill the center of the tooth with unscented baby oil and allow it to remain until as much oil as possible is soaked into the microscopic pores of the ivory. Clear paste wax or high-end car wax will seal the surface after oiling. Bone items are even more fragile (more fibrous and porous) and may be treated the same way: with a light clear mineral oil. Organic oils are inadvisable, as they will eventually hasten discoloration, as on old piano keys subjected to the natural oils in one's hands.

Professional conservators of art and historic artifacts generally recommend against applying any type of dressing (like oil or wax) to organic objects such as whale ivory. Sensible choices regarding storage and display preserve whale ivory best: keep out of direct sunlight, handle with cotton gloves or freshly washed hands, and avoid keeping in places with shifting humidity and temperature. Coating organic objects can induce eventual cracking.

Design
Whale teeth and bones were a highly variable medium, used to produce both practical pieces, such as hand tools, toys and kitchen utensils, and highly decorative pieces, which were purely ornamental. The designs on the pieces varied greatly as well, though they often had whaling scenes on them. For example, Herman Melville, in Moby-Dick, refers to "lively sketches of whales and whaling-scenes, graven by the fishermen themselves on Sperm Whale-teeth, or ladies' busks wrought out of the Right Whale-bone, and other skrimshander articles". Most engravings were adapted from books and papers.

Collections
A significant amount of the original scrimshaw created by whalers is currently held by museums. Museums with significant collections include:
 The Hull Maritime Museum in Kingston upon Hull, England
 The Kendall Whaling Museum, which is part of the New Bedford Whaling Museum in New Bedford, Massachusetts
 The Scott Polar Research Institute in Cambridge, England
 The Scrimshaw Museum at the Peter Café Sport in Horta on the island of Faial in the Azores
 The Nantucket Whaling Museum
 The Mariners' Museum in Newport News, Virginia
Other images of scrimshaw can be found at:
 The Museum of New Zealand Te Papa Tongarewa
 Ripley's Museum Niagara Falls – Scrimshaw piano key art
 Ripley's Museum Baltimore – Scrimshaw piano key art
 DaVinci exhibit – world travelling exhibit – Scrimshaw piano key art

Modern scrimshaw

While scrimshaw artists rarely use whale bone anymore, it is still employed by a few. Common modern materials are micarta, ivory (elephant, fossil, walrus), hippo tusk, warthog ivory, buffalo horn, giraffe bone, mother of pearl, and camel bone. Modern scrimshaw typically retains the nautical themes of historical scrimshaw, but can also extend well beyond the traditional motifs.

Contemporary trade and carving techniques have led to more advanced, but fewer unique scrimshaw carvings. Collectors are advised to be aware of fakes.

See also 

 Chip work - glassware, engraved in a similar manner
 Bone carving

References

Notes

Further reading 
 Stevens, Jim (2008). Scrimshaw Techniques, History, Gallery, Equipment, Types of Ivory, Alternative Materials, Cutting, Sanding, Polishing, Creating Images, Inlays and Basing, Scrimshaw Techniques and Inking, Pub: Schiffer Publishing, 
 Stevens, Jim (2008). Advanced Scrimshaw Techniques, Types of Ivory, Alternative Materials, Color Techniques, Power Scrimshaw, Carving, Imitations and Fakes, Repair, Conservation, Restoration, Glossary, Pub: Schiffer Publishing, 
Stevens, Jim (2010). Powder Horns: Fabrication & Decoration, Powder horn working, shaping, decorating, and finishing techniques. Historic and modern tools illustrate inlays, engrailing, and how to scrimshaw powder horns. Pub: Schiffer Publishing,

External links

Nantucket Historical Association Artifacts Online database
Whaling depicted in scrimshaw and the art in ship logbooks

Carving
Engraving
Ivory works of art
Whale products
Visual arts media
Maritime history
Maritime culture
Bone carvings